The 2007 Hungaroring GP2 Series round was a GP2 Series motor race held on 4 and 5 August 2007 at the Hungaroring in Mogyoród, Pest, Hungary. It was the seventh round of the 2007 GP2 Series season. The race weekend supported the 2007 Hungarian Grand Prix.

Classification

Qualifying 

 Mike Conway was handed a three place penalty for passing the chequered flag twice during free practice.

Feature race

Sprint race 

 Christian Bakkerud was unable to start the race due to her back injury.
 Markus Niemelä was unable to start the race after being offended her shoulder in the feature race.

Standings after the round 

 Drivers' Championship standings

 Teams' Championship standings

 Note: Only the top five positions are included for both sets of standings.

Notes

References

External links 
 Official website of GP2 Series

Hungaroring
GP2
Hungaroring